"The Girl I Used to Know" is a 1990 pop single from the boyband Brother Beyond. The song was recorded specifically for the American edition of their second album Trust, released in mid-1990, with the European edition, which was released in 1989, not containing the song. The song saw a change in the band's musical direction as this track was more funk-orientated and had less of the Motown sound of their earlier work. The song was written and produced by American producers Carl Sturken and Evan Rogers.

Chart success
First released as a single in the US in mid-1990, the track proved to be the group's only single to enter the Billboard Hot 100, peaking at #27. Singer Nathan Moore has alleged the band were required to pay £100,000 to the mafia as part of a payola strategy to secure US airplay for the single.

The song also peaked at #62 in Canada. In the UK and Europe, the single was released as a non-album single in 1991, peaking at #48 in the UK in January of that year. This would be the group's last single to chart, and they disbanded not long after, with record label EMI dumping them amid promotion for the track.

Music video
A video for the song directed by Anton Corbijn featuring the band driving in a convertible motor was shot in the Sahara Desert in southern Morocco in November 1990. These were interspersed with black and white studio scenes of the band performing.

References

Brother Beyond songs
1990 singles
Parlophone singles
Songs written by Carl Sturken and Evan Rogers
1990 songs